Teerapat Sajakul (RTGS: Thiraphat Satchakun), nickname Tui, is a Thai actor and singer. He is also the chief executive for SEED 97.5 FM, one of the most popular radio stations run by MCOT.

Filmography

Television

TV Series

Discography 

 Albums TEERAPAT (2001) with GMM Grammy
Albums Phleng Man Pha Pai (2003) with GMM Grammy

References

External links 
 
 

1973 births
Living people
Teerapat Sajakul
Teerapat Sajakul
Teerapat Sajakul
Teerapat Sajakul
Teerapat Sajakul
Teerapat Sajakul
Teerapat Sajakul
Teerapat Sajakul
Teerapat Sajakul